Steven John Martin (born 26 February 1963) is an Australian politician. Prior to entering politics he was a third generation farmer.

In 2020, Martin was preselected for the top spot on the Liberal Party ticket in the Agricultural region over the incumbent, Jim Chown. At the 2021 Western Australian state election, Martin was elected to the Western Australian Legislative Council. He had previously run in that region in 2013 and 2017 but was not elected on either occasion. He also served as a Wickepin town councilor.

References 

Living people
Members of the Western Australian Legislative Council
Liberal Party of Australia members of the Parliament of Western Australia
21st-century Australian politicians
1963 births